Upton Cross and Upton are hamlets a quarter of a mile apart in east Cornwall, England, United Kingdom. They are on the northeast side of Caradon Hill on the B3254 Liskeard to Launceston road. St Paul's Church at Upton Cross is a mission church built in this corner of the parish of Linkinhorne in 1887 to serve the needs of the local mining community.

A little further north are the hamlets of Darleyford and North Darley below Notter Tor and a remarkable tree, the Darley Oak.

At Netherton Farm Yarg cheese was produced from 1984 to 2006 by Lynher Dairies. Cornish Blue, a cheese made by the Cornish Cheese Company at Upton Cross, was the winning cheese in the World Food Awards in December 2010.

The Hurlers are a group of three stone circles some distance to the west.

References

Hamlets in Cornwall